Cáhuil is a Chilean village located  south of Pichilemu, at the mouth of the seasonal Nilahue Estuary, in the O'Higgins Region. Its economy is based on the production of sea salt, oysters, and mussels. The estuary is  suitable for fishing, swimming, and boating.

Salt deposits 
The production of salt is a very old practice in the area. The indigenous people were known to have extracted salt in a very rudimentary way. Production has increased using modern methods. As of 1978, more than 60% of the population of Cáhuil lives on the proceeds of salt production, unrelated to industrial enterprises.

To promote tourism in Cáhuil, the Municipality of Pichilemu created the "Salt Route", that takes tourists to places where salt is produced. This tour starts in Pichilemu and includes Cáhuil, Barrancas, La Villa, El Bronce, La Palmilla, and La Plaza. Along the route are two rural establishments, "Oro Blanco" and "El Bronce".

Fauna 
At least 46 bird species are found in the Cáhuil zone, many of them in danger of extinction. Some of them are the coscoroba swan, the brown-hooded gull, and the white-necked heron. The area hosts at least seven species of ducks.

See also

 List of towns in Chile

External links 

 Los Trazados de la Sal - Salinas de Cahuil, VI Región 

Populated places in Pichilemu
Coasts of O'Higgins Region